Colonization, or colonisation, constitutes large-scale population movements wherein migrants maintain strong links with their, or their ancestors', former country and by such links gain advantage over other inhabitants of the territory. When colonization takes place under the protection of colonial structures, it may be termed settler colonialism. This often involves the settlers dispossessing indigenous inhabitants, or instituting legal and other structures which  disadvantage them.

Colonization can be defined as a process of establishing foreign control over target territories or peoples for the purpose of cultivation, often by establishing colonies and possibly by settling them.

In colonies established by Western European countries in the Americas, Australia, and New Zealand, settlers (supplemented by Central European, Eastern European, Asian, and African people) eventually formed a large majority of the population after assimilating, warring with, or driving away indigenous peoples. 

Elsewhere Western European settlers formed minority groups, often dominating the non-Western European majority.

During the European colonization of Australia, New Zealand, and other places in Oceania, explorers, and colonists often regarded the landmasses as terra nullius ("empty land" in Latin). Owing to the absence of Western farming techniques, Europeans deemed the land unaltered by mankind and therefore treated it as uninhabited, despite the presence of indigenous populations. In the 19th century, laws and ideas such as Mexico's General Colonization Law and the United States' manifest destiny doctrine encouraged further colonization of the Americas, already begun in the 15th century. 

Despite countless declarations and referendums from the United Nations on the independence of colonial countries and peoples, implemented since 1946, there are in the world still over 60 colonies – sometimes designated territories – including Puerto Rico, Guam, and Bermuda.

Lexicology
Someone who engages in colonization, i.e. the agent noun, is referred to as a colonizer, while the person who gets colonized, i.e. the object of the agent noun or absolutive, is referred to as a colonizee, colonisee or the colonised.

Pre-modern colonizations

Classical period 

In ancient times, maritime nations such as the city-states of Greece and Phoenicia often established colonies to farm what they believed was uninhabited land. Land suitable for farming was often occupied by migratory 'barbarian tribes' who lived by hunting and gathering. To ancient Greeks and Phoenicians, these lands were regarded as simply vacant. However, this did not mean that conflict did not exist between the colonizers and local/native peoples. Greeks and Phoenicians also established colonies with the intent of regulating and expanding trade throughout the Mediterranean and Middle East.

Another period of colonization in ancient times was during the Roman Empire. The Roman Empire conquered large parts of Western Europe, North Africa, and West Asia. In North Africa and West Asia, the Romans often conquered what they regarded as 'civilized' peoples. As they moved north into Europe, they mostly encountered rural peoples/tribes with very little in the way of cities. In these areas, waves of Roman colonization often followed the conquest of the areas. Many of the current cities throughout Europe began as Roman colonies, such as Cologne, Germany, originally called Colonia Claudia Ara Agrippinensium by the Romans, and the British capital city of London, which the Romans founded as Londinium.

Middle Ages 
The decline and collapse of the Roman Empire saw (and was partly caused by) the large-scale movement of people in Eastern Europe and Asia. This is largely seen as beginning with nomadic horsemen from Asia (specifically the Huns) moving into the richer pasture land to the west, thus forcing the local people there to move further west and so on until eventually the Goths were forced to cross into the Roman Empire, resulting in continuous war with Rome which played a major role in the fall of the Roman Empire. During this period there were large-scale movements of people establishing new colonies all over western Europe.  The events of this time saw the development of many of the modern-day nations of Europe like the Franks in France and Germany and the Anglo-Saxons in England.

In West Asia, during Sassanid Empire, some Persians established colonies in Yemen and Oman. The Arabs also established colonies in Northern Africa, Mesopotamia, and the Levant.

The Vikings of Scandinavia also carried out a large-scale colonization. The Vikings are best known as raiders, setting out from their original homelands in Denmark, southern Norway, and southern Sweden, to pillage the coastlines of northern Europe. In time, the Vikings began trading and established colonies. The Vikings first came across Iceland and established colonies there before moving onto Greenland, where they briefly held some colonies. The Vikings launched an unsuccessful attempt at colonizing an area they called Vinland, which is probably at a site now known as L'Anse aux Meadows, Newfoundland and Labrador, on the eastern coastline of Canada.

Modern colonialism 

In the Colonial Era, colonialism in this context refers mostly to Western European countries' colonization of lands mainly in the Americas, Africa, Asia and Oceania. The main European countries active in this form of colonization included Spain, Portugal, France, the Tsardom of Russia (later Russian Empire), the Kingdom of England (later Great Britain), the Netherlands, and the Kingdom of Prussia (now mostly Germany), and, beginning in the 18th century, the United States. Most of these countries had a period of almost complete power in world trade at some stage in the period from roughly 1500 to 1900. Beginning in the late 19th century, Imperial Japan also engaged in settler colonization, most notably in Hokkaido and Korea.

While some European colonization focused on shorter-term exploitation of economic opportunities (Newfoundland, for example, or Siberia) or addressed specific goals such as settlers seeking religious freedom (Massachusetts), at other times long-term social and economic planning was involved for both parties, but more on the colonizing countries themselves, based on elaborate theory-building (note James Oglethorpe's Colony of Georgia in the 1730s and Edward Gibbon Wakefield's New Zealand Company in the 1840s).

Colonization may be used as a method of absorbing and assimilating foreign people into the culture of the imperial country. One instrument to this end is linguistic imperialism, or the use of non-indigenous colonial languages to the exclusion of any indigenous languages from administrative (and often, any public) use.

Post-colonial variants

Soviet Union

In the 1920s, the Soviet regime implemented the so-called korenization policy in an attempt to win the trust of non-Russians by promoting their ethnic cultures and establishing for them many of the characteristic institutional forms of the nation-state. The early Soviet regime was hostile to even voluntary assimilation, and tried to de-Russify assimilated non-Russians. Parents and students not interested in the promotion of their national languages were labeled as displaying "abnormal attitudes". The authorities concluded that minorities unaware of their ethnicities had to be subjected to Belarusization, Polonization, etc.

By the early 1930s, this extreme multiculturalist policy proved unworkable and the Soviet regime introduced a limited Russification for practical reasons; voluntary assimilation, which was often a popular demand, was allowed. The list of nationalities was reduced from 172 in 1927 to 98 in 1939, by revoking support for small nations in order to merge them into bigger ones. For example, Abkhazia was merged into Georgia and thousands of ethnic Georgians were sent to Abkhazia. The Abkhaz alphabet was changed to a Georgian base, Abkhazian schools were closed and replaced with Georgian schools, the Abkhaz language was banned. The ruling elite was purged of ethnic Abkhaz and by 1952 over 80% of the 228 top party and government officials and enterprise managers in Abkhazia were ethnic Georgians (there remained 34 Abkhaz, 7 Russians and 3 Armenians in these positions). For Königsberg area of East Prussia (modern Kaliningrad Oblast) given to the Soviet Union at the 1945 Potsdam Conference Soviet control meant a forcible expulsion of the remaining German population and mostly involuntary resettlement of the area with Soviet civilians.

Russians were now presented as the most advanced and least chauvinist people of the Soviet Union.

Baltic states 

Large numbers of ethnic Russians and other Russian speakers were settled in the three Baltic countries – Lithuania, Latvia, and Estonia – after their reoccupation in 1944, while local languages, religion and customs were suppressed. David Chioni Moore classified it as a "reverse-cultural colonization", where the colonized perceived the colonizers as culturally inferior. Colonization of the three Baltic countries was closely tied to mass executions, deportations and repression of the native population. During both Soviet occupations (1940–1941; 1944–1991) a combined 605,000 inhabitants of the three countries were either killed or deported (135,000 Estonians, 170,000 Latvians and 320,000 Lithuanians), while their properties and personal belongings, along with ones who fled the country, were confiscated and given to the arriving colonists – Soviet military and NKVD personnel, as well as functionaries of the Communist Party and economic migrants from kolkhozs.

The most dramatic case was Latvia, where the amount of ethnic Russians swelled from 168,300 (8.8%) in 1935 to 905,500 (34%) in 1989, whereas the proportion of ethnic Latvians fell from 77% in 1935 to 52% in 1989. Baltic states also faced intense economic exploitation, with Latvian SSR, for example, transferring 15.961 billion rubles (or 18.8% percent of its total revenue of 85 billion rubles) more to the USSR budget from 1946 to 1990 than it received back. And of the money transferred back, a disproportionate amount was spent on the region's militarization and funding of repressive institutions, especially in the early years of the occupation. It has been calculated by a Latvian state-funded commission that the Soviet occupation cost the economy of Latvia a total of 185 billion euros.

Conversely, Marxian economist and world-systems analyst Samir Amin asserts that, in contrast to colonialism, capital transfer in the USSR was used to develop poorer regions in the South and East with the wealthiest regions like Western Russia, Ukraine, and the Baltic Republics being the main source of capital. Estonian researcher Epp Annus acknowledges that the Soviet rule in the Baltic states did not possess every single characteristic of traditional colonialism since the Baltic states were already modern industrial European nation states with an established sense of national identity and cultural self-confidence prior to their Soviet invasion in 1940 and proposed that the initial Soviet occupation developed into a colonial rule gradually, as the local resistance turned into a hybrid coexistence with the Soviet power. The Soviet colonial rule never managed to fully establish itself and began rapidly disintegrating during perestroika, but after the restoration of independence, the Baltic states similarly had to deal with problems of a characteristically colonial nature, such as pollution, economic collapse and demographic tensions.

Jewish oblast

In 1934, the Soviet government established the Jewish Autonomous Oblast in the Soviet Far East to create a homeland for the Jewish people. Another motive was to strengthen Soviet presence along the vulnerable eastern border. The region was often infiltrated by the Chinese; in 1927, Chiang Kai-shek had ended cooperation with the Chinese Communist Party, which further increased the threat. Japan also seemed willing and ready to detach the Far Eastern provinces from the USSR. To make settlement of the inhospitable and undeveloped region more enticing, the Soviet government allowed private ownership of land. This led to many non-Jews to settle in the oblast to get a free farm.

By the 1930s, a massive propaganda campaign developed to induce more Jewish settlers to move there. In one instance, a government-produced Yiddish film called Seekers of Happiness told the story of a Jewish family that fled the Great Depression in the United States to make a new life for itself in Birobidzhan. Some 1,200 non-Soviet Jews chose to settle in Birobidzhan. The Jewish population peaked in 1948 at around 30,000, about one-quarter of the region's population. By 2010, according to data provided by the Russian Census Bureau, there were  only 1,628 people of Jewish descent remaining in the JAO (1% of the total population), while ethnic Russians made up 92.7% of the JAO population. The JAO is Russia's only autonomous oblast and, aside of Israel, the world's only Jewish territory with an official status.

Israel

According to Elia Zuriek, in his book "Israel's Colonial Project in Palestine: Brutal Pursuit", Israeli settlements in the West Bank is an additional form of colonization. This view is part of a key debate in the Israeli–Palestinian conflict. Law professors Steven Lubet and Jonathan Zasloff describe the "Zionism as settler colonialism" theory as politically motivated, derogatory and highly controversial. According to them, there are important differences between Zionism and settler colonialism, for instance: (1) Early Zionists did not seek to transport European culture into Israel, they sought to revive the culture of a indigenous people of the land, the culture of their ancestors (e.g., they left their European languages behind and adopted a Middle Eastern\Semitic one: Hebrew); (2) No settler colonial movement ever claimed to be "returning home"; (3) Jews had already been living in the "colonized" region for thousands of years. Both professors also point out that the academic journal where Wolfe published his essay fails to mention the Islamic military campaign that captured the region in the 7th and 8th centuries.

Indonesia

The transmigration program is an initiative of the Indonesian government to move landless people from densely populated areas of Java, but also to a lesser extent from Bali and Madura,  to less populous areas of the country including Papua, Kalimantan, Sumatra, and Sulawesi.

Papua New Guinea 
In 1884 Britain declared a protective order over South East New Guinea, establishing an official colony in 1888. Germany however, annexed parts of the North. This annexation separated the entire region into the South, known as "The Territory of Papua" and North, known as "German New Guinea".

Philippines 

Due to marginalisation produced by continuous Resettlement Policy, by 1969, political tensions and open hostilities developed between the Government of the Philippines and Moro Muslim rebel groups in Mindanao.

Myanmar

Subject peoples
Many colonists came to colonies for slaves to their colonizing countries, so the legal power to leave or remain may not be the issue so much as the actual presence of the people in the new country. This left the indigenous natives of their lands slaves in their own countries.

The Canadian Indian residential school system was identified by the Truth and Reconciliation Commission (Canada) as colonization through depriving the youth of First Nations in Canada of their languages and cultures.

During the mid 20th century, there was the most dramatic and devastating attempt at colonization, and that was pursued with Nazism. Hitler and Heinrich Himmler and their supporters schemed for a mass migration of Germans to Eastern Europe, where some of the Germans were to become colonists, having control over the native people. These indigenous people were planned to be reduced to slaves or wholly annihilated.

Many advanced nations currently have large numbers of guest workers/temporary work visa holders who are brought in to do seasonal work such as harvesting or to do low-paid manual labor. Guest workers or contractors have a lower status than workers with visas, because guest workers can be removed at any time for any reason.

Endo-colonization
Colonization may be a domestic strategy when there is a widespread security threat within a nation and weapons are turned inward, as noted by Paul Virilio:
Obsession with security results in the endo-colonization of society: endo-colonization is the use of increasingly powerful and ubiquitous technologies of security turned inward, to attempt to secure the fast and messy circulations of our globalizing, networked society...it is the increasing domination of public life with stories of dangerous otherness and suspicion...
Some instances of the burden of endo-colonization have been noted:
The acute difficulties of the Latin American and southern European military-bureaucratic dictatorships in the seventies and early eighties and the Soviet Union in the late eighties can in large part be attributed to the economic, political and social contradictions induced by endo-colonizing militarism.

Space colonization

See also

 Colonization
 Colonialism
 Coloniality of gender
 Colonization of Antarctica
 Cocacolonization
 Ocean colonization
 List of colonial empires

 Other related
 Colonisation (biology)
 Human settlement
 Imperialism
 Pre-Columbian trans-oceanic contact

Notes and references

Bibliography 
 Cooper, Frederick, Colonialism in Question: Theory, Knowledge History’’, Berkeley: University of California Press, 2005
 Jared Diamond, Guns, germs and steel. A short history of everybody for the last 13,000 years, 1997.
 Ankerl Guy, Coexisting Contemporary Civilizations: Arabo-Muslim, Bharati, Chinese, and Western, INUPress, Geneva, 2000. .
 Cotterell, Arthur. Western Power in Asia: Its Slow Rise and Swift Fall, 1415 - 1999'' (2009) popular history;  excerpt

 
Articles containing video clips
Settler colonialism